Trimioplectus is a genus of ant-loving beetles in the family Staphylinidae. There are at least three described species in Trimioplectus.

Species
These three species belong to the genus Trimioplectus:
 Trimioplectus auerbachi Park, 1949
 Trimioplectus australis Chandler, 1990
 Trimioplectus obsoletus Brendel, 1891

References

Further reading

External links

 

Pselaphinae
Articles created by Qbugbot